The Lopatcong Township School District is a comprehensive community public school district that serves students in pre-kindergarten through eighth grade from Lopatcong Township, in Warren County, New Jersey, United States.

As of the 2018–19 school year, the district, comprising two schools, had an enrollment of 737 students and 54.4 classroom teachers (on an FTE basis), for a student–teacher ratio of 13.5:1.

The district is classified by the New Jersey Department of Education as being in District Factor Group "DE", the fifth-highest of eight groupings. District Factor Groups organize districts statewide to allow comparison by common socioeconomic characteristics of the local districts. From lowest socioeconomic status to highest, the categories are A, B, CD, DE, FG, GH, I and J.

Public school students in ninth through twelfth grades attend Phillipsburg High School in Phillipsburg as part of a sending/receiving relationship with the Phillipsburg School District. The high school also serves students from four other sending communities: Alpha, Bloomsbury (in Hunterdon County), Greenwich Township and Pohatcong Township. The site of the new Phillipsburg High School, which began construction in January 2014, is in Lopatcong's borders. The three-story,  building, with more than double the floor space of the existing high school and a capacity to accommodate more than 2,100 students, was completed for the 2016–17 school year and was dedicated in September 2016 at ceremonies attended by Governor of New Jersey Chris Christie. As of the 2018–19 school year, the high school had an enrollment of 1,650 students and 126.5 classroom teachers (on an FTE basis), for a student–teacher ratio of 13.0:1.

Schools
Schools in the district (with 2018–19 enrollment data from the National Center for Education Statistics) are:
Elementary school
Lopatcong Elementary School with 378 students in grades PreK-4
Eric Renfors, Interim Principal
Middle school
Lopatcong Middle School with 356 students in grades 5-8
Rick Bonney, Principal

Before the Middle School opened in 2003, students would attend the Elementary School through eighth grade.

Administration
Core members of the district's administration are:
Dr. Debra Mercora, Superintendent 
Atilla Sabahoglu, Business Administrator

Board of education
The district's board of education, comprised of nine members, sets policy and oversees the fiscal and educational operation of the district through its administration. As a Type II school district, the board's trustees are elected directly by voters to serve three-year terms of office on a staggered basis, with three seats up for election each year held (since 2012) as part of the November general election. The board appoints a superintendent to oversee the district's day-to-day operations and a business administrator to supervise the business functions of the district.

References

External links
Lopatcong Township School District
Lopatcong Township PTA
 
Data for the Lopatcong Township School District, National Center for Education Statistics
Phillipsburg High School

Lopatcong Township, New Jersey
New Jersey District Factor Group DE
School districts in Warren County, New Jersey